Milpillas de Allende is a town in the southern portion of the Mexican state of Zacatecas, at around 21°19'31" N,  103°36'50" W, in the municipality of Teúl de González Ortega.  People of this singular town grow corn and blue agave in peculiar red soil, and also engage in cattle ranching.

The most important building structure of the town, is without a doubt the church in the name of San José (Saint Joseph). Its colorful fiesta on his honor is celebrated annually around the second week of January. Other important buildings include the lienzo charro and soccer field with artificial turf and several spectator seating rows that was inaugurated in January 2016 

The name of the town is a result of the union of: Milpillas (cornfields) and Allende, the last name of Ignacio Allende.  The original name was San Jose de Milpillas, in honor of the town’s patron saint. However, by the 1950 government census the town appears with the name Milpillas de Allende.

History
Before México was conquered, this region was inhabited by native Indians probably controlled by the Caxcan.  In 1688 on July 16 Alonso de Zevallos VillaGutierrez, governor of the Nueva Galicia, grants the land to Pedro Castañeda under a royal decree.

Climate
The weather is semi-dry without a well defined spring station. It rains about 4 months of the year. Jun – September. This time of year is well known as "Las Aguas", which means "the waters"

Climate

Communication
The town has mail service, radio and TV and in 2003 phone service was installed and with it access to the Internet.

See also
Huitzila (Zacatecas)

References

Populated places in Zacatecas